HONK!, also known as HONK! Fest, is a festival of activist street bands held annually on Indigenous Peoples' Day weekend in Somerville, Massachusetts. Each year since 2006, an all-volunteer organizing community invites more than 25 bands from around New England, North America, and the world to participate in this free three-day event that showcases acoustic and ambulatory bands playing free music in public spaces. Since its inception, it has inspired additional HONK! festivals in other locations.

Description
HONK!s so far have been staged in Somerville, Massachusetts; Seattle, Washington; Austin, Texas; Providence, Rhode Island; New York, New York; Eugene, Oregon; Montpelier, Vermont; Spokane, Washington; Rio de Janeiro, São Paulo, Brasília, Brazil; and Wollongong, NSW, Australia. Although each festival is locally organized and there is no central HONK! authority, they share common features.  Each HONK! invites twelve to over thirty bands, who play multiple sets in outdoor public spaces over the course of two or three days.  These shows are free to attend.  Some HONK!s also feature a parade.  The festivals are volunteer-run and get support from local sponsors.

The bands invited to play at HONK! share common characteristics: they are ambulatory, they use instruments that can be simultaneously carried and played, and they utilize little or no electronic amplification.  As a result, the bands are able to play while moving.  There is no generally agreed-upon label for this type of band; labels in use include "activist street band," "radical marching band," and "community street band."

Although many of the bands that play at HONK! have the phrase "marching band" in their names, they bear only superficial resemblance to a traditional marching band.  Traditional marching band characteristics derive from their military history: they tend to feature regimented, synchronized movement and matching uniforms, and play music that has been composed and arranged in advance, with the goal of presenting the band as a cohesive unit without any differentiation between individual members.  Band members are typically drawn from and affiliated with some larger organization, such as a school.

A HONK!-style street band, on the other hand, more often tends to encourage the individuality of its members: it may have a theme to its garb rather than a uniform, with individual members free to implement that theme in a manner of their own choosing; similarly, its music may offer more chances for improvisation.  Many HONK! bands incorporate traditional marching band instrumentation, sometimes augmented with other instruments or vocalists; others use instrumentation drawn from non-Western music traditions, such as those of a Brazilian samba school.  A HONK! band may exist for a specific purpose—some perform primarily at activist events, for instance—but they are typically autonomous entities not affiliated with another organization.

History
The longest-running HONK! has taken place in Somerville, Massachusetts' Davis Square neighbourhood every October since 2006.  It was begun by a committee of members from a Somerville activist band, The Second Line Social Aid and Pleasure Society Brass Band, who saw the need for a gathering of like-minded souls interested in applying the joy of music to the work of promoting peace, social justice, and civic engagement. Since 2007, it has included a parade titled "Reclaim the Streets for Horns, Bikes and Feet!"  The parade features the bands along with other non-musician participants, including puppeteers and visual artists such as the Bread & Puppet Theater and organizations that promote transportation alternatives and environmental and social justice, such as Bikes Not Bombs.

The COVID-19 pandemic in 2020 forced all of their events to online.

Other HONK! Fests
HONK NYC! was born in 2007 when The Pink Puffers (Rome, Italy), Environmental Encroachment (Chicago), and March Fourth (Portland, Oregon), visited New York City following that year’s HONK! in Somerville. Events around the city included a dinner party at the space The Change You Want to See on Havermeyer Street, hosted by members of Brooklyn’s Hungry March Band. This set up a tradition of creating events for bands that wanted to visit NYC and play gigs after HONK! fest. In 2008, Titubanda from Rome were presented in parties, parades, parks, and rallies. In 2009, the name BONK! Brooklyn HONK Festival was adopted and used through 2011. The festival was renamed as HONK NYC! In 2012. In addition to small parades and free outdoor gigs, HONK NYC also has ticketed nighttime events in clubs and warehouse spaces.

HONK! Fest West has been held every spring in Seattle starting in 2008.  In its second year, HONK! Fest West 2009 took place in several locales around Seattle: Friday night in Ballard, Saturday night in Georgetown, Sunday daytime at Gas Works Park and Sunday evening at The Vera Project.  HONK! Fest West 2010 took place Friday night in Fremont, Saturday afternoon in the Central District, Saturday night in Georgetown, and Sunday afternoon at the Alaska Junction in West Seattle.

HONK!TX has been held in Austin every March starting in 2011.  The 2011 festival took place on East Sixth Street on Friday, in the North University neighborhood on Saturday, and, following a march through the center of Austin, in Pan-Am Park on Sunday.  Subsequent years have used South Congress instead of East Sixth.

HONK! Fest Eugene (PKA Yonk!) was founded in June 2015 when local Brazilian percussion ensemble Samba Ja hosted SambAmore (Arcata, CA), Environmental Encroachment (Chicago), Junkadelic (Australia) along with local bands Kef, The Beatcrunchers, and High Step Street Band on 2 outdoor stages.  Since then it has been held every year in the Whiteaker neighborhood of Eugene, Oregon the week following HONK! Fest West in Seattle.  It features traveling groups from Seattle's festival as well as local percussion and brass ensembles.  In 2017 the festival changed names from Yonk! to Honk! Fest Eugene and grew into a 2-day festival and retreat for touring bands.

HONK!Oz was inaugurated in January 2015 in the community of Wollongong, New South Wales, Australia as a fringe festival of the long-running Illawarra Folk Festival in the nearby community of Bulli.

HONK!Rio was inaugurated in August 2015, taking place in various communities in and around the city of Rio de Janeiro, Brazil.

HONK SP takes place in São Paulo, Brasil and started in November 2017, bringing together a vast number of groups, including Brass Bands and Carnival "Blocos", occupying the city's districts.

PRONK! is a one-day festival in Providence, Rhode Island. It happens the day after the Boston-area HONK! ends and features many of the same groups that performed in Somerville and Cambridge over the weekend.

HONK!BC is the first Canadian version of the HONK! Festival and it was organized by Open Air Orchestra Society (The Carnival Band, Greenhorn Community Music Project). It was inaugurated in August 2018 in Vancouver, BC and took place at multiple venues in the Commercial Drive area (East Vancouver) such as Britannia Community Services Centre, Strange Fellows Brewing, Grandview Park and The Legion on Commercial Drive. These are some of the bands that attended to the first edition of this festival:

 The Carnival Band, Vancouver
 Balkan Shmalkan, Vancouver
 Bloco Energia, Vancouver
 Home Going Brass Band, Vancouver
 Greenhorn Community Music Project, Vancouver
 Freddy Fuddpucker, from North Vancouver
 Thunderbird Alumni Band, from UBC
 Filthy FemCorps, from Seattle, WA
 Rise Up! Action Band, from Seattle, WA

Participating Bands

HONK! 2016 
 aNova Brazil (Boston, MA)
 Boycott (Somerville, MA)
 The Brass Balagan (Burlington, VT)
 Brass Messengers (Minneapolis, MN)
 The Bread and Puppet Circus Band (Glover, VT)
 Caka!ak Thunder (Greensboro, NC)
 Chaotic Insurrection Ensemble (Montreal, QC)
 Detroit Party Marching Band (Detroit, MI)
 Dirty Water Brass Band (Boston, MA)
 Emperor Norton’s Stationary Marching Band (Somerville, MA)
 Environmental Encroachment (Chicago, IL)
 Expandable Brass Band (Northampton, MA)
Extraordinary Rendition Band (Providence, RI)
 La Fanfare Invisible (Paris, France)
 Forward! Marching Band (Madison, WI)
 Hartford Hot Several (Hartford, CT)
 Leftist Marching Band (Portsmouth, NH)
 Mayday Marching Band (Pittsburgh, PA)
 Original Pinettes Brass Band (New Orleans, LA)
 The Party Band (Lowell, MA)
 Le Pompier Poney Club (Marseille, France)
 Rude Mechanical Orchestra (New York City, NY)
 School of HONK (Somerville, MA)
 Second Line Social Aid and Pleasure Society Brass Band (Somerville, MA)
 What Cheer? Brigade (Providence, RI)
 Yes Ma’am Brass Band (Austin, TX)

HONK! 2015 (Tenth Anniversary)
 Artesian Rumble Arkestra (Olympia, WA)
 AfroBrazil (Boston, MA)
 The Brass Balagan (Burlington, VT)
 The Bread and Puppet Circus Band (Glover, VT)
 Dead Music Capital Band (Austin, TX)
 Detroit Party Marching Band (Detroit, MI)
 Dirty Water Brass Band (Somerville, MA)
 DJA-Rara (Brooklyn, NY)
 Emperor Norton’s Stationary Marching Band (Somerville, MA)
 Environmental Encroachment (Chicago, IL)
 Expandable Brass Band (Northampton, MA)
 Extraordinary Rendition Band (Providence, RI)
 Forward! Marching Band (Madison, WI)
 Gora Gora Orkestar (Boulder, CO)
 The Hill Stompers (Los Alamos, NM)
 Hungry March Band (Brooklyn, NY)
 Leftist Marching Band (Portsmouth, NH)
 Les Vilains Chicots (Paris, France)
 Minor Mishap Marching Band (Austin, TX)
 New Creations Brass Band (New Orleans, LA)
 Original Big Seven Social Aid and Pleasure Club (New Orleans, LA)
 The Party Band (Lowell, MA)
 Rude Mechanical Orchestra (New York City, NY)
 School of HONK (Somerville, MA)
 Second Line Social Aid and Pleasure Society Brass Band (Somerville, MA)
 Ten Man Brass Band (Seattle, WA)
 tint(A)nar (Quebec City, QC)

HONK! 2014
 Artesian Rumble Arkestra (Olympia, WA)
 AfroBrazil (Boston, MA)
 The Brass Balagan (Burlington, VT)
 The Bread and Puppet Circus Band (Glover, VT)
 Caka!ak Thunder (Greensboro, NC)
 The Carnival Band (Vancouver, BC)
 Chaotic Insurrection Ensemble (Montreal, QC)
 Chaotic Noise Marching Corps (Seattle, WA)
 Dirty Water Brass Band (Somerville, MA)
 Emperor Norton’s Stationary Marching Band (Somerville, MA)
 Environmental Encroachment (Chicago, IL)
 Expandable Brass Band (Northampton, MA)
 Extraordinary Rendition Band (Providence, RI)
 Forward! Marching Band (Madison, WI)
 The Hill Stompers (Los Alamos, NM)
 Himalayas (New York City, NY)
 Leftist Marching Band (Portsmouth, NH)
 Les Muses Tanguent (Paris, France)
 Minor Mishap Marching Band (Austin, TX)
 New Creations Brass Band (New Orleans, LA)
 Pakava It (Moscow, Russia)
 The Party Band (Lowell, MA)
 Red Flame Hunters (New Orleans)
 Rude Mechanical Orchestra (New York City, NY)
 Second Line Social Aid and Pleasure Society Brass Band (Somerville, MA)
 Seed & Feed Marching Abominable (Atlanta, GA)
 Veveritse (Brooklyn, NY)
 What Cheer? Brigade (Providence, RI)

HONK! 2013
 aNova Brazil (Boston, MA)
 The Brass Balagan (Burlington, VT)
 Brass Messengers (Minneapolis, MN)
 The Bread and Puppet Circus Band (Glover, VT)
 Detroit Party Marching Band (Detroit, MI)
 Dirty Water Brass Band (Boston, MA)
 DJA-Rara (Brooklyn, NY)
 Emperor Norton’s Stationary Marching Band (Somerville, MA)
 Environmental Encroachment (Chicago, IL)
 Expandable Brass Band (Northampton, MA)
 Extraordinary Rendition Band (Providence, RI)
 Forward! Marching Band (Madison, WI)
 Gora Gora Orkestar (Boulder, CO)
 Hungry March Band (Brooklyn, NY)
 Leftist Marching Band (Portsmouth, NH)
 Minor Mishap Marching Band (Austin, TX)
 Original Big Seven Social Aid and Pleasure Club (New Orleans, LA)
 Os Siderais (Rio De Janeiro)
 The Party Band (Lowell, MA)
 Perhaps Contraption (London, UK)
 Rude Mechanical Orchestra (New York City, NY)
 Second Line Social Aid and Pleasure Society Brass Band (Somerville, MA)
 What Cheer? Brigade (Providence, RI)
 Young Fellaz Brass Band (New Orleans, LA)

HONK! 2012
 AfroBrazil (Boston, MA)
 The Brass Balagan (Burlington, VT)
 Brass Liberation Orchestra (San Francisco, CA)
 Brass Messengers (Minneapolis, MN)
 The Bread and Puppet Circus Band (Glover, VT)
 Caka!ak Thunder (Greensboro, NC)
 The Carnival Band (Vancouver, BC)
 Chaotic Insurrection Ensemble (Montreal, QC)
 Chaotic Noise Marching Corps (Seattle, WA)
 Church Marching Band (Santa Rosa, CA)
 Detroit Party Marching Band (Detroit, MI)
 Dirty Water Brass Band (Somerville, MA)
 DJA-Rara (Brooklyn, NY)
 Emperor Norton’s Stationary Marching Band (Somerville, MA)
 Environmental Encroachment (Chicago, IL)
 Expandable Brass Band (Northampton, MA)
 Extraordinary Rendition Band (Providence, RI)
 Forward! Marching Band (Madison, WI)
 Gora Gora Orkestar (Boulder, CO)
 The Hill Stompers (Los Alamos, NM)
 Himalayas (New York City, NY)
 Hungry March Band (Brooklyn, NY)
 Leftist Marching Band (Portsmouth, NH)
 Loyd Family Players (Oakland, CA)
 Lungs Face Feet (Pittsburgh, PA)
 Minor Mishap Marching Band (Austin, TX)
 Pink Puffers Brass Band (Rome, Italy)
 The Primate Fiasco (Northampton, MA)
 Rude Mechanical Orchestra (New York City, NY)
 Second Line Social Aid and Pleasure Society Brass Band (Somerville, MA)
 Seed & Feed Marching Abominable (Atlanta, GA)
 tint(A)nar (Quebec City, QC)
 Veveritse (Brooklyn, NY)
 What Cheer? Brigade (Providence, RI)
 Young Fellaz Brass Band (New Orleans, LA)

HONK! 2011
 AfroBrazil (Boston, MA)
 The Brass Balagan (Burlington, VT)
 Brass Messengers (Minneapolis, MN)
 The Bread and Puppet Circus Band (Glover, VT)
 Caka!ak Thunder (Greensboro, NC)
 The Carnival Band (Vancouver, BC)
 Chaotic Insurrection Ensemble (Montreal, QC)
 Detroit Party Marching Band (Detroit, MI)
 Dirty Water Brass Band (Somerville, MA)
 DJA-Rara (Brooklyn, NY)
 Emperor Norton’s Stationary Marching Band (Somerville, MA)
 Environmental Encroachment (Chicago, IL)
 Expandable Brass Band (Northampton, MA)
 Extraordinary Rendition Band (Providence, RI)
 Factory Seconds (Somerville, MA)
 Forward! and The Milwaukee Molotov Marchers (Wisconsin, US)
 Hungry March Band (Brooklyn, NY)
 Leftist Marching Band (Portsmouth, NH)
 Minor Mishap Marching Band (Austin, TX)
 The Open Hand Orchestra (Portland, ME)
 Rude Mechanical Orchestra (New York City, NY)
 Second Line Social Aid and Pleasure Society Brass Band (Somerville, MA)
 Seed & Feed Marching Abominable (Atlanta, GA)
 The Springville All Star Marching Band (Springville, NY)
 Titanium Sporkestra (Seattle, WA)
 What Cheer? Brigade (Providence, RI)
 Young Fellaz Brass Band (New Orleans, LA)

HONK! Fest West 2010
 Artesian Rumble Arkestra
 Banda Gazona
 BeatCrunchers
 Bolting Brassicas Marching Band
 Brass Messengers
 The Carnival Band
 Detroit Party Marching Band
 Environmental Encroachment
 Emperor Norton's Stationary Marching Band
 Extraordinary Rendition Band
 Garfield High School Bulldog Drumline
 Hubbub Club
 Hungry March Band
 Leland Stanford Junior University Marching Band
 MarchFourth Marching Band
 Minor Mishap Marching Band
 Orkestar Slivovica
 Orkestar Zirkonium
 Samba Já
 Seattle Seahawks Blue Thunder Drumline
 Sound Wave Sounders FC Band
 Titanium Sporkestra
 VamoLá
 Yellow Hat Band
 Yesterday's Chonies

HONK! Fest West 2009
 BeatCrunchers
 The Carnival Band
 Environmental Encroachment
 Emperor Norton's Stationary Marching Band
 Hubbub Club
 Leland Stanford Junior University Marching Band
 Loyd Family Players
 MarchFourth Marching Band
 Orkestar Zirkonium
 Samba Já
 Seattle Seahawks Blue Thunder Drumline
 Second Line Social Aid and Pleasure Society Brass Band
 Sound Wave
 Titanium Sporkestra
 VamoLá
 Yellow Hat Band

HONK! Fest West 2008
 Anti-Fascist Marching Band (Seattle)
 The Carnival Band (Vancouver, BC)
 La Banda Gozona (seattle)
 Samba Olywa (olympia)
 Environmental Encroachment (Chicago)
 Black Bear Combo (Chicago)
 Hungry March Band (Brooklyn)
 Samba Ja (Eugene)
 Santa Cruz Trash Orchestra (Santa Cruz)
 Weapons of Marching Destruction (Seattle) now Titanium Sporkestra
 Yellow Hat Band (Seattle)
 Vamola! (Seattle)
 Peace Bandits (Olympia) now Artesian Rumble Arkestra
 Ballard Sedentary Sousa Band (Seattle)
 Raging Grannies (Seattle)

HONK! 2010
 AfroBrazil
 The Barrage Band Orchestra
 Black Bear Combo
 Brass Liberation Orchestra
 The Bread & Puppet Circus Band
 Detroit Party Marching Band
 Dirty Water Brass Band
 DJA-Rara
 EE – Environmental Encroachment
 Emperor Norton’s Stationary Marching Band
 The Expandable Brass Band
 Extraordinary Rendition Band
 Factory Seconds
 Himalayas
 Leftist Marching Band
 Young Fellaz Brass Band
 the Hubbub Club
 Rude Mechanical Orchestra
 Second Line Social Aid & Pleasure Society Brass Band
 Seed & Feed Marching Abominable
 The Springville All Star Marching Band
 tint(A)nar
 Veveritse
 What Cheer? Brigade

HONK! 2009
 AfroBrazil
 The Bahamas Junkanoo Jumpers
 Banda Roncati
 The Barrage Band Orchestra
 Black Bear Combo
 Brass Messengers
 The Bread & Puppet Circus Band
 Caka!ak Thunder
 The Carnival Band
 Chaotic Insurrection Ensemble
 EE – Environmental Encroachment
 Emperor Norton’s Stationary Marching Band
 Extraordinary Rendition Band
 Himalayas
 Hungry March Band
 Leftist Marching Band
 Loyd Family Players
 Minor Mishap Marching Band
 Orkestar Zirkonium
 The Original Pinettes Brass Band
 Pink Puffers
 Rude Mechanical Orchestra
 Samba Tremeterra
 The Scene Of The Crime Rovers
 Second Line Social Aid & Pleasure Society Brass Band
 Seed & Feed Marching Abominable
 The Springville All Star Marching Band
 What Cheer? Brigade
 Yellow Hat Band

HONK! 2008
 Brass Liberation Orchestra
 Brass Messengers
 Bread and Puppet Circus Band
 Caka!ak Thunder
 Chaotic Insurrection Ensemble
 District Circus Marching Band
 Original Big 7 Social Aid and Pleasure Club
 Himalayas
 Hungry March Band
 Loyd Family Players
 March Fourth Marching Band
 Rude Mechanical Orchestra
 Seed & Feed Marching Abominable
 The Scene of the Crime Rovers
 Titubanda
 The TriBattery Pops - Tom Goodkind Conductor
 Flaming Trolleys
 Environmental Encroachment
 Emperor Norton's Stationary Marching Band
 Leftist Marching Band
 What Cheer? Brigade
 Yellow Hat Band
 Honk! Volunteer Second Line Band
 Tufts / Somerville Honk! U Bands
 Second Line Social Aid and Pleasure Society Brass Band

HONK! 2007
 Black Bear Combo
 Brass Liberation Orchestra
 Bread and Puppet Circus Band
 Caka!ak Thunder
 Chaotic Insurrection Ensemble
 Emperor Norton's Stationary Marching Band
 Environmental Encroachment
 Himalayas with Lesser Panda
 Hungry March Band
 Leftist Marching Band
 March Fourth Marching Band
 Near & Now One-Man Band & Healing Orchestra
 Original Big 7 Social Aid and Pleasure Club
 Pink Puffers Drum & Brass Phunk Band
 Rude Mechanical Orchestra
 Second Line Social Aid and Pleasure Society Brass Band
 What Cheer? Brigade

HONK! 2006
 The Carnival Band
 Black Bear Combo
 Brand New Orleans Brass Band
 Brass Liberation Orchestra
 Environmental Encroachment
 Hungry March Band
 Leftist Marching Band
 Revolutionary Snake Ensemble
 Rude Mechanical Orchestra
 Second Line Social Aid and Pleasure Society Brass Band
 Stick and Rag Village Orchestra
 What Cheer? Brigade

Notes

External links

 HONK! homepage
 HonkFest West homepage
 HONK!TX homepage
 PRONK! Providence Honk Festival homepage
 HONK NYC! homepage
 HONK! Fest Eugene homepage
 HONK! if you are having fun by Mark Shanahan and Meredith Goldstein, Boston Globe, October 14, 2014
 March madness HONK! fest in Davis Square celebrates the power and joy of music made for revolution by Andrew Gilbert, Boston Globe, October 3, 2007
 Return of honk by Milva Didomizio, Boston Globe, October 4, 2007
 HONK! festival makes some noise in Davis Square by Michael Naughton, Boston Globe, October 7, 2007

Music festivals in Rhode Island
Music festivals in Massachusetts
Music festivals in New York (state)
Festivals in Seattle
Festivals in Austin, Texas
Music festivals in Texas
Music festivals in Washington (state)